Lauro Severiano Müller (8 November 1863 – 30 July 1926) was a Brazilian politician, diplomat, and military engineer. Responsible for the transition of Santa Catarina from a province to a state, he is also recognised as one of those who helped achieve the Brazilian diplomatic victory over Bolivia through the Treaty of Petrópolis, which allowed for the purchase of Acre and its incorporation into Brazil.

Müller occupied the 34th chair of the Brazilian Academy of Letters from 1912 until his death in 1926.

Biography 
Born in Itajaí, Santa Catarina, he was the son of the German immigrants Peter Müller and Anna Michels, originally from the Rhineland. On his mother's side, his first cousin was Filipe Schmidt, who also served two terms as President of Santa Catarina. A passionate follower of Benjamin Constant's positivism in his youth, he embarked on a military career in his native province after a brief stint in a merchant's office.

His political career began in 1889, when the first President of Brazil, Deodoro da Fonseca, made him President of Santa Catarina and charged him with organising the province that had been transformed into a state.

Later, he served as a federal deputy, senator (1899–1926), member of the Academy of Letters (1912–1926), and minister of state. He carried out great reforms while holding the ministerial portfolios of Industry, Transport and Public Works, during the presidency of Rodrigues Alves. As Minister of Foreign Affairs a post he assumed in 1912 upon the untimely death of the Barão do Rio Branco, he pursued economic integration with Argentina and Chile. He was forced to resign in 1917 because Brazil had entered World War I on the side of the Allies, and anti-German sentiment created opposition to him due to his German roots. He was elected President of Santa Catarina again in 1918, but preferred to remain a senator.

During an official visit to the U.S. as Minister of Foreign Affairs, he was offered the title of Doctor Honoris Causa by Harvard University. He was also made an honorary samurai on an official visit to Japan.

The positions he held in his long political career include:
Member of the Constitutional Assembly
Member of Congress
Governor of the State
Minister of Public Works
General of the Army
Minister of Foreign Affairs
Senator of the Republic

He became popular for his important public works, such as the construction of Rio de Janeiro's Avenida Central, today Avenida Rio Branco, and improvements to that city's port. He died in Rio in 1926.

References 

  Brazilian Regional Bio-Bibliographic Dictionary
  Some famous people named Müller

External links 
 

Brazilian diplomats
Foreign ministers of Brazil
Brazilian people of German descent
1863 births
1926 deaths
Governors of Santa Catarina (state)
Members of the Brazilian Academy of Letters